Brandon Laird (born 1970s) is an American men's basketball coach. He was recently the interim head coach of Sacramento State.

Laird attended El Camino Fundamental High School. He walked on to the basketball team at UC Davis in 1997 and played sparingly as a freshman. Laird helped the team win the 1998 NCAA Division II men's basketball tournament and earn two conference titles. During his junior season, he emerged as a three-point shooting threat.

Laird began his coaching career in 2001 as an assistant at  El Camino Fundamental High School. In 2002, he was hired as an assistant coach at UC Davis. Laird joined the coaching staff at NAIA team Menlo College as an assistant in 2003. He was promoted to head coach in 2006. Laird posted a 41–41 record and helped the team win the California Pacific Conference Tournament and earn a berth in the NAIA Div. II Championships during the 2007–08 season In July 2009, he rejoined the staff at UC Davis. Laird was hired as an assistant at Sacramento State in 2011. He was promoted to associate head coach the following season. Laird helped the 2014-15 team finish with a record of 21-12 and reach the postseason for the first time in the Division 1 era.

Sacramento State head coach Brian Katz retired just prior to the start of the 2021–22 season due to a health issue. Laird became the interim coach. He took over with full support from the team, and guard Zach Chappell praised him as "a great leader".

Head coaching record

References

External links
Sacramento State Hornets bio

1970s births
Living people
American men's basketball coaches
American men's basketball players
Basketball coaches from California
Basketball players from Sacramento, California
High school basketball coaches in the United States
Sacramento State Hornets men's basketball coaches
UC Davis Aggies men's basketball coaches
UC Davis Aggies men's basketball players